Women in Cinema Collective, abbreviated as WCC, is an organisation for women working in the Malayalam cinema industry.

Formation
The organisation was formed following harassment of a Malayalam cinema actress. The organisation aims at the welfare of women in Malayalam cinema. On 1 November 2017, Women in Cinema Collective Foundation was registered as a society in Kerala.

Activities
 Punarvaayana, a year-long series of events was intended to address and bring more awareness in the society on issues such as exclusionary workspaces, workplace exploitation and gender discrimination. This curtain-raiser brought together prominent and successful women from various fields — including mediapersons, lawyers, bureaucrats, politicians, social activists to discuss and contemplate on these matters.
 WCC also intends to celebrate the role of women in cinema by holding exhibitions and announcing end-of-year awards for Malayalam Cinema that pass the Bechdel Test.
On 18 May 2017, WCC submitted a petition to the Chief Minister of Kerala, requesting an inquiry and prompt action on the sexual assault case involving a prominent film actress in the Malayalam Cinema. Later WCC also publicly condemned and revolted against the decision of AMMA to reinstate actor Dileep, when the matter was only sub judice.
 WCC members has requested the intervention of the government to formalise wage structure and welfare schemes for women working in the film industry such as maternity pay and tax subsidies for production crews that have at least 30% women representation, among many others.
 WCC requested the Government of Kerala to start more movie production related technical courses that provides direct employment opportunities for more women and provide for more women's reservations in government-owned studios.

Controversies
Actor Parvathy Thiruvothu, a member of AMMA and WCC, was one of the first to openly state that films with misogynist dialogues should not be encouraged. She named the veteran actor Mammootty’s film Kasaba (2016) as one such movie. She requested that senior actors like Mammootty who is much respected and has a wide fan following should henceforth refrain from acting in movies that has such misogynistic scripts for the betterment of the society at large. Parvathy's viewpoint received mostly criticism but also some support from the film fraternity and she became the victim of cyber-bullying. She was viciously trolled and abused by fans of Mammootty and two of them were arrested by the Kerala Police following a complaint from Parvathy.

Similar initiatives 
Film Employees Federation of Kerala (FEFKA) rolls out its own women's wing. Bhagyalakshmi, the chairperson of the newly created women's wing, criticised WCC in being selective in its approach. The new women's wing which in many ways is looked upon as a parallel association to WCC, is claimed to be a platform where concerns of women technicians can be voiced out and they would act as arbitrators with the concerned producers to sort them out.

References

External links
 
Women in Cinema Collective Official Website

Women's organisations based in India
Film organisations in India
Organizations established in 2017